Lucius Cornelius Bocchus  was a Lusitanian from Roman Hispania who wrote about natural history.  Ancient authors mention his writings, which are otherwise lost. Pliny the Elder provides an excerpt from the chronicle of Cornelius Bocchus and mentions him as one of his sources.

Sources 
Delporte, Frédéric. Les minéraux : l'histoire de leur commerce 
Corpus Scriptorium Latinorum
Hofmann, Johann Jacob (1635-1706)
Historia da Lingua Portuguesa. Revista Lusitana. vol XXV, N 1-4

References

Romans from Hispania
Lusitanians
Portuguese non-fiction writers